The City Circle is a largely-underground railway line in central Sydney, Australia.

City Circle may also refer to:
 City Circle tram, a tram service in central Melbourne, Australia, aimed at tourists
 City Circle Line, a circular line of the Copenhagen Metro
 City Circle, a former bus service of First Bradford in West Yorkshire, United Kingdom

See also 
 Circle City (disambiguation)
 City Loop, a subway and rail loop in central Melbourne, Australia